is a Japanese factory racing driver, currently competing in the Autobacs Super GT Series as a factory driver for Nissan. He is a graduate of the Nissan Driver Development Program (NDDP), and a past champion of the Bathurst 12 Hour race, and the GT World Challenge Europe Endurance Cup.

Career

Early career
Chiyo began racing cars in 2007, competing in the Formula Challenge Japan (FCJ) series after earning a scholarship from the NDDP. He finished third in the 2008 FCJ series, before moving into the National Class of the All-Japan Formula Three Championship in 2009. Chiyo won the National Class title in 2011 with NDDP Racing, winning five races to defeat Honda prospect Tomoki Nojiri on a tie breaker.

Chiyo returned to All-Japan F3 in 2013, competing in the main class with the B-Max Racing Team. He finished third in the championship, with two victories. Chiyo took part in the 2013 Macau Grand Prix, finishing in 15th place. In 2015, Chiyo made a one off return to F3 at Fuji Speedway. In 2016, Chiyo returned to F3 to contest the full season with B-Max Racing. He won one race, and finished sixth in the championship, after missing four races over two rounds due to a back injury.

Super GT (2012-present)

After winning the All-Japan F3 National Class title in 2011, Chiyo stepped up to the Autobacs Super GT Series, racing a Nissan GT-R GT3 in the GT300 class for NDDP Racing. He took his first victory at Sportsland SUGO with Yuhi Sekiguchi, and went on to finish the season in fourth place. With NDDP prospect Daiki Sasaki moving up to GT300, Chiyo moved to pro-am team Dijon Racing for the 2013 season. He finished 28th in the standings after taking just one points-scoring finish.

After missing the 2014 season due to his new commitments in Europe, Chiyo returned to Super GT in 2015, this time with Gainer in their new Nissan GT-R alongside André Couto. Chiyo and Couto won the second round of the championship, the Fuji 500km. Then in the Suzuka 1000km, Chiyo, Couto, and third driver Ryuichiro Tomita won the GT300 class, despite carrying 88 kilogrammes of Success Ballast. Chiyo finished the season second in the championship, despite missing two races due to his ongoing commitments in the GT World Challenge Europe Endurance Cup. 

His performances in Japan and Europe secured a promotion to the GT500 class for the 2016 season, joining three-time GT500 champion Satoshi Motoyama at MOLA. Chiyo and Motoyama finished third at Okayama International Circuit in their first race together. Chiyo suffered a spinal injury after a crash in the summer race at Fuji, which forced him to miss over a month of competition including the Suzuka 1000km. He finished the season twelfth in the standings in 2016, and again in 2017, where Chiyo nearly took his first premier class victory at Sugo after a last-lap battle between Motoyama and Kohei Hirate. 

Chiyo and Motoyama remained team mates in 2018, as MOLA were replaced in GT500 by the new NDDP Racing with B-Max team. They finished 17th in the championship that season. After the season, Chiyo was assigned to drive in the Intercontinental GT Challenge for Nissan and KC Motorgroup (KCMG), resulting in his second sabbatical from Super GT. At the sixth round of the season in Autopolis, Chiyo was called on as a last-minute replacement for James Rossiter at Calsonic Team Impul, after Rossiter was diagnosed with acute tinnitus. 

Chiyo returned to full-time GT500 competition in 2020, returning to NDDP Racing with B-Max alongside Hirate. They ranked 13th in the championship in 2020, and both drivers were retained for 2021.

International GT racing 
Chiyo began racing in the Blancpain Endurance Series (now the GT World Challenge Europe Endurance Cup) in 2014, driving a Nissan GT-R Nismo GT3 for RJN Motorsport. He scored a podium finish at Circuit Paul Ricard. Along with Alex Buncombe and Wolfgang Reip, Chiyo won the 2015 series. The trio won the 1000 km Paul Ricard and finished third in the final race of the series at the Nürburgring, taking the title by three points over the Bentley M-Sport entry of Steven Kane, Andy Meyrick and Guy Smith. In doing so, Chiyo became the first Japanese driver to win a championship in a top-level sports car racing series organized by the Stéphane Ratel Organisation, and the first to win a major sports car racing championship of any kind outside of Asia.

Chiyo competed in the 2014 Bathurst 12 Hour as part of the Nismo Global Driver Exchange, driving a Nissan GT-R Nismo GT3 with Buncombe and Reip. Chiyo was involved in a crash in the early stages of the race, ending the team's chances after 58 laps. Chiyo returned to the race in 2015, this time paired with Reip and Florian Strauss. The trio won the race after Chiyo took the lead with two laps remaining. In the 2016 race, Chiyo finished a close second driving with Kelly and Strauss. 

In 2017, Chiyo participated in the Blancpain Endurance Series with Alex Buncombe and Lucas Ordonez with RJN who retired the Nissan GT Academy program to run a new program with Motul forming "Motul Team RJN Nissan. Chiyo, Buncombe and Ordóñez withdrew the first race after Bentley Team M-Sport's driver Guy Smith caused a severe multi-car pileup accident which involved Chiyo. The team went on to finish twenty-third in the championship talley.  Chiyo returned to the sport in 2019, driving for KCMG after RJN Motorsport withdrew the Nissan marque. He was teamed with Tsugio Matsuda and Josh Burdon. Chiyo was set to debut the 2020 Bathurst 12 Hour with Burdon and Matsuda but withdrew the race after he crashed in the first practice which caused major damage to the Nissan GT-R Nismo GT3.

Super Formula (2018) 
Chiyo competed for one season in the Japanese Super Formula Championship, driving for B-Max Racing Team in 2018. His best finish was tenth place at the season-ending JAF Grand Prix Suzuka.

Racing record

Career summary

* Season still in progress.

‡ Team standings.

Complete Super GT results 
(key) (Races in bold indicate pole position) (Races in italics indicate fastest lap)

* Season still in progress.

Complete Intercontinental GT Challenge results

* Season still in progress.

Complete Bathurst 12 Hour results

References

External links
 

Living people
1987 births
Sportspeople from Tokyo
Japanese racing drivers
Formula Challenge Japan drivers
Japanese Formula 3 Championship drivers
Super GT drivers
Blancpain Endurance Series drivers
24 Hours of Spa drivers
Super Formula drivers
24H Series drivers
Nismo drivers
Nürburgring 24 Hours drivers
Kelly Racing drivers
KCMG drivers
B-Max Racing drivers